Bala Salkuyeh (also Romanized as Bālā Sālkūyeh; also known as Sālkūyeh and Sālkūyeh-ye Bālā) is a village in Daryasar Rural District, Kumeleh District, Langarud County, Gilan Province, Iran. At the 2006 census, its population was 385, in 108 families.

References 

Populated places in Langarud County